The Case of the Scorpion's Tail (Italian: La coda dello scorpione / Tail of the Scorpion) is a 1971 Italian giallo film directed by Sergio Martino, produced by Luciano Martino and co-written by Ernesto Gastaldi and Eduardo Maria Brochero. It starred George Hilton, Anita Strindberg, Ida Galli and Janine Reynaud, and the music soundtrack was by Bruno Nicolai.

Plot summary 
A widow named Lisa (Ida Galli) inherits a small fortune when her husband dies in a freak jet crash. However, before she can escape to a retreat with her secret lover, the widow is brutally slashed to death and the money stolen. Now an insurance investigator (George Hilton) and his journalist love interest (Anita Strindberg) must figure out exactly who is murdering anyone involved with the late widow, and why. A strange gold cufflink holds the key to the mystery.

Plot synopsis 
Lisa Baumer walks the streets of London to return home, where she calls her lover for a liaison. While they have sex, her husband Kurt takes a transcontinental flight, which explodes and falls into the sea, killing Kurt and everyone else on board. Lisa gets the call that night, and she later meets with an insurance company, an accountant stating she's the heir to a million dollars US, which she's to collect in Athens, Greece. Lisa's ex, Philipe, stalks her and demands a payoff, or else he'd try to report her for allegedly blowing up the plane. She begrudgingly gives him some cash and arranges for a meeting to exchange the rest of the money. An unseen figure watches everything. Where they're to meet, she finds Philippe stabbed and just about to die, but Lisa flees to catch her flight to Greece.

Insurance investigator Peter Lynch is hired to tail Lisa to affirm the legitimacy of the payout. He meets Lisa when his cover is blown at the hotel. Also following Lisa is Kurt's mistress, Lara Florakis, along with her muscle, Abad Sharif. Cornering her at an abandoned theater, Florakis and Sharif try to make her give them the money, as Florakis feels entitled and also believes Lisa killed Kurt by bombing the plane. When Lisa runs, Florakis and Sharif try to capture her, but Lynch helps Lisa escape. Once Lisa gets the money, she arranges to meet her lover for a flight out of the country, Lynch seemingly waiting in the lobby to follow her again. However, a masked killer breaks into Lisa's home and slashes her to death, stealing all the money and leaving her to be found laying in her own blood.

The police of Athens are on the case of the murder, led by Inspector Stavros. Also investigating is Interpol agent John Stanley, who'd been following Lisa since the airplane explosion, which his agency believed was a bombing, but couldn't prove with the wreckage at the bottom of the ocean. Lynch and Florakis are questioned, and the press and paparazzi surround Lynch on his way out the door. One journalist, Cléo Dupont, is dazzled by Lynch, who notices and charms her accordingly. They agree to investigate together and start a relationship.

Lynch goes to question Florakis, where Stanley also arrived. Sharif narrowly killed Lynch with a hatchet, but Lynch ducked before Sharif ran, Stanley unable to catch him. Lynch is furious and near beating answers out of Florakis, but Stanley pulls him away. Florakis plays dumb when Stanley questions her, but Lynch accuses Florakis and Sharif of being the killers. That night, the killer tries to break into Florakis' door, but ends up crashing through a window. He chases her down and slashes her throat. Sharif, arriving from Florakis' distress call, chases the killer to the rooftop. The killer jumps Sharif, knocks him to the edge of the shingles roof, and cuts his hands to force his grip loose, sending Sharif plunging to his death.

The lover, George Barnet, reconvenes in a hotel with a stewardess, his girlfriend, Barnet also having a uniform in his possession. One night, when Lynch joins Cléo at her studio apartment, the killer attacks her and slashes her shoulder. Lynch breaks through the locked door, causing the killer to flee after kicking Lynch to keep him from chasing. At the scene is a cuff link, in the shape of a scorpion. An image of Kurt shows him with the same cuff links, and Lynch surmises Kurt is alive and in turn the killer. Barnet is then attacked by the killer in his hotel room. When he fights back, the killer stabs his eye with a broken bottle and then stabs his heart.

Lynch and Cléo arrange a trip on Lynch's yacht as part of a getaway. In the meantime, the police meet the stewardess, noticing her lapel pin is the same design as the cuff link. Lynch goes fishing, and Cléo sees Lynch dive into an underwater cave. When Cléo reaches air, she finds in the rocks of the cave floor a plastic bag with the insurance money. Lynch catches her and forces her back to the boat, eventually admitting he really was the killer all alone. Lisa's lover was his accomplice, and the bomber of the plane, and the whole plot was arranged to lure Lisa where she was to be killed, all to take the money. Lynch escalated to killing all liabilities, including Barnet, who was arranged to attack Cléo to diver suspicion from Lynch. When Lynch offers to escape with Cléo, she rushes to the radio and tries to call for help. The radio wasn't turned on, and Lynch furiously chases after her. Cléo stabs Lynch's shoulder with a harpoon, dives into the sea, and flees to a nearby island, Lynch in tow not far behind. When he catches up to her and is ready to brutally murder her, Lynch is shot by police, who figure out Lynch was guilty and rushed to save Cléo. Lynch crawled away and bled to death.

At the hospital, Cléo was told by Stavros and Stanley the maker of the lapel pin and the cuff link revealed the scorpion adornment at Cléo's apartment was a fake, a custom order only Lynch could've planted at the scene. Stavros sees Cléo off when she's about to leave Greece, Stanley waiting for her in the car and wanting to accompany her.

Cast 
  
 George Hilton as Peter Lynch
 Anita Strindberg as Cléo Dupont
 Alberto de Mendoza as John Stanley
 Ida Galli as Lisa Baumer
 Janine Reynaud as Lara Florakis
 Luigi Pistilli as Inspector Stavros
 Tom Felleghy as Mr. Brenton
 Luis Barboo as Sharif
 Lisa Leonardi as Hostess
 Tomás Picó as George Barnet

Critical reception 

AllMovie called it a "devilishly entertaining giallo thriller".

Adrian Luther Smith wrote "....one of the best of Sergio Martino's impressive batch of thrillers. It has considerable energy, some pleasing exotic locations and is crammed with a great cast of shady characters.....The resulting gory carnage is graphically presented."

References

External links 

 

1971 films
1970s psychological thriller films
Spanish thriller films
Films directed by Sergio Martino
Films shot in Athens
Films shot in Madrid
Giallo films
Italian thriller films
Films set in Greece
Films produced by Luciano Martino
Films scored by Bruno Nicolai
1970s Italian films